Stephanotrypeta taeniaptera is a species of tephritid or fruit flies in the genus Stephanotrypeta of the family Tephritidae.

Distribution
Congo, Uganda, Burundi, Kenya, Zimbabwe, South Africa.

References

Tephritinae
Taxa named by Mario Bezzi
Insects described in 1923
Diptera of Africa